Bismarck School District (BSD) is a public school district based in Bismarck, Arkansas, United States. BSD serves more than 950 students and employs more than 150 faculty and staff at its three schools.

The district encompasses  of land. within Hot Spring County and Clark County. It serves Bismarck. It also serves areas near Bonnerdale.

Schools 
 Bismarck High School, serving grades 9 through 12.
 Bismarck Middle School, serving students in grades 5 through 8.
 Bismarck Elementary School, serving students in prekindergarten through grade 4.

References

External links

 

Education in Clark County, Arkansas
Education in Hot Spring County, Arkansas
School districts in Arkansas